Panu Aaltio (born 29 January 1982) is a Finnish film composer. He was educated at the Sibelius Academy and University of Southern California and established himself as a film composer with The Home of Dark Butterflies (2008). He has received the International Film Music Critics Association Award for Best Original Score for a Documentary three times, for Tale of a Forest (2012), Tale of a Lake (2016) and Tale of the Sleeping Giants (2021).

Life and work
Panu Aaltio was born in Nurmijärvi on 29 January 1982. Wanting to become a film composer, he studied music technology at the Sibelius Academy in Finland, attended the Scoring for Motion Pictures and Television program at the University of Southern California and worked as an intern on film and television productions in Los Angeles. After returning to Finland, he became established there as a composer for feature films, television series and video games.

For both Tale of a Forest and Tale of a Lake he received the International Film Music Critics Association Award for Best Original Score for a Documentary. Tale of a Lake also received the Jussi Award for Best Music.

Selected filmography
 The Home of Dark Butterflies (2008)
 Sauna (2008)
  (2011)
 Body of Water (2011)
 Tale of a Forest (2012)
 I Won't Come Back (2014)
 Moomins on the Riviera (2014)
  (2014)
  (2015)
 Tale of a Lake (2016)
 Lake Bodom (2016)
  (2016)
  (2017)
 The Eternal Road (2017)
  (2018)
  (2019)
  (2020)
  (2020)
 Finders of the Lost Yacht (2021)
 Tale of the Sleeping Giants (2021)

References

External links
 Personal website

1982 births
Living people
People from Nurmijärvi
Finnish film score composers
Finnish male composers
Male film score composers
Male television composers
Video game composers
USC Thornton School of Music alumni
Sibelius Academy alumni